Phyllis Margaret Handover (1923-1974), who published as P. M. Handover, was an English writer on typography.

Works
 The Site of the Office of the Times: the history from 1276 to 1956 of the site in Blackfriars, consisting of Printing House Square ... and other thoroughfares, the whole now being the freehold property of the Times Publishing Company limited, Times Publishing Co., 1956
 Arbella Stuart, royal lady of Hardwick and cousin to King James, 1957
 The second Cecil: the rise to power, 1563-1604 of Sir Robert Cecil, late first earl of Salisbury, 1959
 Stanley Morison: a second handlist 1950-1959, 1959
 Printing in London : from 1476 to modern times: competitive practice and technical invention in the trade of book and Bible printing, periodical production, jobbing &c, 1960
 A History of the London Gazette, 1665-1965, 1965

References

1923 births
1974 deaths
Historians of printing
English bibliographers
Women bibliographers